The Chairman of the Presidium of the Supreme Soviet of the Estonian Soviet Socialist Republic was the highest official in the Estonian Soviet Socialist Republic, which was in turn a part of the Soviet Union.

Below is a list of office-holders:

See also 
President of Estonia

Footnotes

Sources 
World Statesmen – Estonian Soviet Socialist Republic

Political history of Estonia
Estonian SSR
Lists of political office-holders in Estonia
List